Francisco José Bellingi (born 8 July 1988) was an Argentine footballer.

He played for then Segunda División B side Atlético Sanluqueño CF as a defender.

References
 
 

1988 births
Living people
Argentine footballers
Argentine expatriate footballers
Argentine expatriate sportspeople in Uruguay
Argentine expatriate sportspeople in Chile
Argentine expatriate sportspeople in Spain
Santiago Morning footballers
Plaza Colonia players
Atlético Sanluqueño CF players
Primera B de Chile players
Segunda División B players
Expatriate footballers in Chile
Expatriate footballers in Spain
Expatriate footballers in Uruguay
Association football defenders
Footballers from La Plata